Intergal-Bud is the biggest private Ukrainian construction company. It is the largest real-estate developer in the capital city of Kyiv. Besides Kyiv, Intergal-Bud is building residential complexes, business centers and shopping facilities in Lviv, Chernivtsi, Zhytomyr, Uzhhorod, Rivne, and Odessa.

History 
Intergal-Bud was founded in Lviv in 2003 and started operations there.

In 2009, the company began building facilities in Kyiv. The first residential complexes were the projects "Park Lakes" and "Yaskravyi".

In 2018, Intergal-Bud began implementing a project to improve the recreation area on the territory of the Expocenter of Ukraine.

In 2019, the company bought 1.4 ha or Arsenal plant territory in Kyiv and rebuilt one of the plant's buildings into an office space.

As of 2021, the company has built more than 3.9 million square meters of real estate.

During 2022 Russian invasion of Ukraine, the company started actively helping to rebuild and defend the country by providing free construction materials and fuel for the installation of protective structures, checkpoints, and the manufacture of anti-tank hedgehogs.

In March 2022, the company presented its investment projects in Ukraine at the international real estate event MIPIM-2022 in Cannes which was held to support Ukraine in its fight against Russian aggressor.

References 

Construction and civil engineering companies of Ukraine